The Houma Courier is a newspaper published daily in Houma, Louisiana, United States, covering Terrebonne Parish.  It was owned by Halifax Media Group until 2015, when In 2015, Halifax was acquired by GateHouse Media. It is sometimes simply referred to as The Courier. The paper is published by Clarice Touhey, the paper's first female Publisher. The paper's Executive Editor is Keith Magill. The paper was founded in 1878 as Le Courrier de Houma by French-born Lafayette Bernard Filhucan Bazet.  It first published in four-page, half-French half-English editions.

The Courier has a daily circulation of 19,700 and a Sunday circulation of 22,100.  Its online edition, Houma Today, was launched in May 1999.

The Courier won the Louisiana Press Association's Newspaper of the Year award in various categories in 2017.

See also
 List of French-language newspapers published in the United States

References

Houma, Louisiana
Newspapers published in Louisiana
Publications established in 1878
Daily newspapers published in the United States
Gannett publications